The 2020–21 season was the 100th season in the existence of C.D. Santa Clara and the club's third consecutive season in the top-flight of Portuguese football. In addition to the domestic league, Santa Clara participated in this season's edition of the Taça de Portugal.

Players

First-team squad

Transfers

In

Out

Pre-season and friendlies

Competitions

Overview

Primeira Liga

League table

Results summary

Results by round

Matches
The league fixtures were announced on 28 August 2020.

Taça de Portugal

Notes

References

C.D. Santa Clara seasons
Santa Clara